The Battle of Kabletown was a battle between Confederate and Union forces  near the end of the American Civil War. Captain John S. Mosby, with nine companies of cavalry, defeated Captain Richard R. Blazer's outnumbered Blazer's Scouts.

Background 
In late 1864, General Ulysses S. Grant's Overland Campaign came to a close. He had laid siege to Petersburg. Captain Blazer's Scouts, a Union company, had already raided the city of Lynchburg, Virginia in the campaign against Richmond. Captain John S. Mosby of the Confederates decided to stop these raids against Virginia by bringing them to battle. On November 18, 1864, the forces met at Kabletown, West Virginia.

Battle 
Mosby had nine companies, the 43rd Battalion Virginia Cavalry, to Captain Richard R. Blazer's one. Mosby was able to defeat Blazer's Scouts due to superior numbers, inflicting 27 casualties. Of the entire number in Blazer's company, 65; 22 killed, 13 escaped and five of these were wounded.

References

External links 
 Identifying more unknowns: Blazer’s Scouts killed in the Kabletown fight against Mosby’s Rangers by Robert Moore.

Kabletown
Kabletown
Jefferson County, West Virginia in the American Civil War
1864 in West Virginia
Kabletown
November 1864 events